Stotonic (O'odham: S-totoñigk) is a census-designated place (CDP) in Pinal County, Arizona, United States, located in the Gila River Indian Community. The population was 659 at the 2010 census. Stotonic Village has a median household income of $2,499 – the lowest of any CDP in Arizona

Demographics 

As of the census of 2010, there were 659 people living in the CDP. The population density was 133.0 people per square mile. The racial makeup of the CDP was 2.6% White, 0.6% Black or African American, 92.6% Native American, 0.2% Pacific Islander, 1.1% from other races, and 3.0% from two or more races. 15.5% of the population were Hispanic or Latino of any race.

Notes

  
 

Census-designated places in Pinal County, Arizona
Gila River Indian Community